Vrtovče is a small village in the hills south of the Vipava Valley in the Municipality of Ajdovščina in the Littoral region of Slovenia.

Geography
Vrtovče consists of the main village core and the smaller hamlet of Lisjaki (also known as Lisjaki na Hribu) to the southeast. Nearby elevations include Školj Hill to the west, Sharp Peak (Ostri vrh) to the southeast, and Tibot Hill to the south. Pralo Creek is fed by a spring south of Vrtovče; the site is known as Pri Studencu (literally, 'at the spring'). The name Pralo comes from the verb prati 'to wash' because the clean water of the creek was used for laundering.

Cultural heritage

A reservoir and water trough were built at Pri Studencu in 1903 to supply workers building the section of the Bohinj Railway between Dornberk and Štanjel. Tibot Hill is named after Saint Theobald; there are ruins of a church dedicated to saint on the hill.

References

External links 

Vrtovče at Geopedia

Populated places in the Municipality of Ajdovščina